Nephilingis dodo is an araneid spider endemic to Mauritius. It was found to be separate from the related species Nephilingis borbonica in 2011.

Anatomy

Female

The abdomen is strikingly white. Females reach a length of about 23mm.

Male

Only 5 to 6 mm in length, males have a grey abdomen with white spots and a yellow-brown sternum.

Distribution

N. dodo is endemic to Mauritius, where it inhabits the native forests.

Name

Named after the vernacular of the extinct flightless bird from Mauritius, the dodo (Raphus cucullatus). These two species once shared their habitat, the increasingly rare native forests in Mauritius. The specific name, a noun in apposition, is meant to increase awareness of the need for urgent conservation of the Mauritius biota.

References

 

Araneidae
Spiders of Africa
Spiders described in 2011